Nuhiu is an Albanian surname. Notable people with the surname include:

 Agim Nuhiu (born 1977), Macedonian politician
 Ardian Nuhiu (born 1978), Macedonian footballer
 Atdhe Nuhiu (born 1989), Kosovo footballer

Albanian-language surnames